The 2021 MAC Championship Game was a college football game played on December 4, 2021, at Ford Field in Detroit, Michigan. It was the 25th edition of the MAC Football Championship Game and determined the champion of the Mid-American Conference (MAC) for the 2021 season. The game began at 12:00 p.m. EST and aired on ESPN. The game featured the Northern Illinois Huskies, the Western Division champions, and the Kent State Golden Flashes, the Eastern Division champions. Sponsored by mortgage lending company Quicken Loans through their Rocket Mortgage brand, the game was officially known as the Rocket Mortgage MAC Championship Game.

Teams
The 2021 MAC Championship Game will feature the Kent State Golden Flashes, champions of the East Division, and the Northern Illinois Huskies, champions of the West Division. This will be the teams' 30th all-time meeting; Northern Illinois enters the game leading the series 21–8. The teams first met in 1949, and have been Mid-American Conference opponents since 1975. The teams last met earlier in the season, with Kent State defeating Northern Illinois 52–47, to break a ten-game losing streak to the Huskies; prior to 2021, the teams last faced off in 2017, with Northern Illinois winning, 24–3.

Kent State

Kent State clinched a spot in the championship game following their win over Miami (OH). It marked their first Eastern Division title since 2012; Kent State is looking for their first MAC title since 1972.

Northern Illinois

Northern Illinois clinched a berth in the championship game following their win over Buffalo.

Game summary

Statistics

References

Championship
MAC Championship Game
Northern Illinois Huskies football games
Kent State Golden Flashes football games
American football competitions in Detroit
MAC Championship
MAC Championship